This article includes a list of countries of the world sorted by current account balance as a percentage of gross domestic product (nominal GDP). 

The first list includes 2017 data for members of the International Monetary Fund. The UN World Bank cites the IMF as the source for their data on Current Account Balance, and so is not included separately on this page. The second list includes only countries for which the CIA World Factbook lists 2015 estimates for both Current Account Balance and GDP.

List of countries by current account balance as a percentage of GDP 
The IMF data are estimates updated for the October 2022 report, derived from 2020 data. The World Factbook data is as of February 2015.

References

See also
List of countries by current account balance
List of countries by GDP (PPP)

Lists of countries by GDP-based indicators